Pusaccocha, Pusac Ccocha or Pusac Cocha (possibly from Quechua pusaq eight qucha lake, "eight lakes") is a group of eight lakes in Peru located in the Ancash Region, Pallasca Province, Huandoval District. The lakes which are lying in a row from east to west are situated north of the lake Piticocha and southwest of the lake Huachumachay (possibly from Quechua Wachumach'ay).

References 

Lakes of Peru
Lakes of Ancash Region